The Women's Time Trial event at the 2010 South American Games was held at 10:00 on March 17.

Medalists

Results

References

Report

Cycling at the 2010 South American Games
2010 in women's road cycling